Adam Mazur (born April 20, 2001) is an American baseball pitcher in the San Diego Padres organization.

Amateur career
Mazur grew up in Woodbury, Minnesota and attended Woodbury High School. He was named All-Metro by the Star Tribune as a senior after posting an 8-2 record with a 0.50 ERA and 112 strikeouts in 72 innings pitched.

Mazur began his college baseball career at South Dakota State. He went 2-7 with a 5.43 ERA and 88 strikeouts in 12 starts during his sophomore season. After the season, Mazur transferred to Iowa. During the summer of 2021, he played collegiate summer baseball for the Wareham Gatemen of the Cape Cod Baseball League. Mazur was named the Hawkeyes Friday night starter going into his first season with the team. Mazur was named the Big Ten Conference Pitcher of the Year at the end of the season.

Professional career 
The San Diego Padres selected Mazur 53rd overall in the 2022 Major League Baseball draft. He signed with the team and received a $1.25 million signing bonus.

References

External links

South Dakota State Jackrabbits bio
Iowa Hawkeyes bio

Living people
Baseball players from Minnesota
Baseball pitchers
Iowa Hawkeyes baseball players
People from Woodbury, Minnesota
South Dakota State Jackrabbits baseball players
Wareham Gatemen players
2001 births